Cheung Chau is one of the 10 constituencies in the Islands District.

Merging Cheung Chau South and Cheung Chau North for the 2019 District Council elections, the constituency returns one district councillor to the Islands District Council, with an election every four years.

Cheung Chau covers the whole island of Cheung Chau. It has projected population of 20,712.

Councillors represented

Election results

2010s

References

Cheung Chau
Constituencies of Hong Kong
Constituencies of Islands District Council
2019 establishments in Hong Kong
Constituencies established in 2019